Jeff Wise is an American author and television journalist. His main topics are science, technology, aviation, and adventure.

He is the author of the book Extreme Fear and has had articles published in: Bloomberg Businessweek, The Huffington Post, Men's Health, Men's Journal, National Geographic Adventure, Nautilus, New York, The New York Times, Popular Mechanics, Psychology Today, Slate, Time, and Travel + Leisure.

Education
Jeff Wise graduated from Harvard with a degree in evolutionary biology.<ref
name="JWAbout"></ref>

Career

Jeff Wise began his freelance writing career after graduating from college, at first focusing on travel and adventure. In a 2010 podcast interview, he describes why he switched fields from biology to journalism:

<blockquote>
“I wasn’t so interested in the test tube work or going out and spending five years investigating the life cycle of a barnacle, but the story of the life cycle of the barnacle can be absolutely fascinating. So, I was very happy to spend … a half an hour reading the paragraph (or whatever it may be) about the barnacle. But, I didn’t want to be the guy in the boat watching the barnacle.”<ref
name="NYAS201002"></ref><ref
name="NYAS201002MP3"></ref>
</blockquote>

Print and digital publications

As of 2016, Jeff Wise has written one book and two shorter electronic-only publications:

 Extreme Fear: The Science of Your Mind in Danger (2009)—book, 256 pages
 The Plane That Wasn't There: Why We Haven't Found Malaysia Airlines Flight 370 (2015)—e-publication, 95 pages
 Fatal Descent: Andreas Lubitz and the Crash of Germanwings Flight 9525 (2015)—e-publication, 61 pages

Television

Jeff Wise has appeared as himself in several TV series and one TV movie, exploring and explaining science and history. His on-camera appearances are:
 TV Series Chelsea (2016): 1 episode
 TV Series Your Bleeped Up Brain (2013): 2 episodes
 TV Series The Indestructibles (2011): 2 episodes
 TV Movie Gates of Hell (2010)
 TV Series MH370: The Plane That Disappeared (2023)
 TV Series Mayday (2011)

He also produced the TV documentary:
 Gringo: The Dangerous Life of John McAfee'' (2016)

Scientific views

Jeff Wise advocates scientific materialism and has explained in an interview with Alex Tsakiris in 2010, using Freud as an example, that a successful explanatory theory requires a mechanism:

“[A] scientific theory is something that tries to increase our understanding by making a prediction, by saying ‘Okay, we’re going to say that the earth orbits around the sun, therefore we would expect to see this motion of the planets,’ or something like that. I think the thing that's often overlooked is that the theory requires a mechanism. And I think this is why Freud ultimately I think was cast aside, because Freud had a lot of interesting ideas and suppositions about how the brain works, but he never offered any mechanisms."

In the same interview, discussing the difference between science and popular, but non-scientific, ideas, Wise said:

“When you mention these guys who claim that they’ve found evidence that near-death experiences cannot be explained through materialistic explanations and so forth, it’s not that I’m afraid to look into it. But it doesn’t really fit into my schema for how I basically have come to conclude the world works. It’s not fear so much as it doesn’t really mesh into how I believe the world fundamentally works.”

Personal life

Wise is married and has two sons. He is an amateur pilot and lives in New York City.

References

External links 

Huffington Post articles
Popular Mechanics articles
Psychology Today articles

American science writers
Living people
Harvard College alumni
Year of birth missing (living people)